The 1941 Butler Bulldogs football team was an American football team that represented Butler University as a member of the Indiana Intercollegiate Conference (IIC) during the 1941 college football season. In its third season under head coach Tony Hinkle, the team compiled a 5–4 record. The team played its home games at the Butler Bowl in Indianapolis.

Six Butler players were selected by The Indianapolis News to its All-Indiana college football teams: center Zane Powell (1st team); end Robert Roberts (1st team); back Boris Dimancheff (1st team); guard Lowell Toelle (2nd team); tackle Dan Zavella (2nd team); and end Harold Miller (3rd team).

Schedule

References

Butler
Butler Bulldogs football seasons
Butler Bulldogs football